The 1989 Afro-Asian Club Championship, was the 4th Afro-Asian Club Championship competition endorsed by the Confederation of African Football (CAF) and Asian Football Confederation (AFC), contested between the winners of the African Champions' Cup and the Asian Club Championship.

The final was contested in two-legged home-and-away format between Algerian team ES Sétif the 1988 African Cup of Champions Clubs winner, and Qatari team Al-Sadd, the 1988–89 Asian Club Championship winner. 

The first leg was hosted by ES Sétif at the 17 June Stadium in Constantine on 12 January 1990, while the second leg was hosted by Al-Sadd at Al-Ahly Stadium in Doha on 19 January 1990.
ES Sétif won the two legs, with a score on aggregate 5–1.

Teams

Match details

First leg

Second leg

Winners

External links
Afro-Asian Club Championship - rsssf.com

Afro-Asian Club Championship
1990 in African football
1990 in Asian football
ES Sétif matches
Al Sadd SC matches
1989–90 in Qatari football
1989–90 in Algerian football
January 1990 sports events in Africa
January 1990 sports events in Asia
International club association football competitions hosted by Algeria
International club association football competitions hosted by Qatar